Drăgănești is a commune in Galați County, Western Moldavia, Romania with a population of 5,827 people. It is composed of two villages, Drăgănești and Malu Alb.

References

Communes in Galați County
Localities in Western Moldavia